Truth and Beauty may refer to:

 Truth & Beauty: The Lost Pieces Volume Two, an album by the American ambient musician Steve Roach
 Truth and Beauty (Ian McNabb album)
 Truth & Beauty (memoir), a memoir by Ann Patchett

See also
 "Ode on a Grecian Urn", an 1819 poem by John Keats which contains the words "Beauty is truth, truth beauty"
 Truth quark and beauty quark, two elementary particles postulated in 1973 and subsequently observed